Discover Science & Engineering (DSE) is an Irish Government initiative that aims to increase interest in science, technology, engineering and mathematics (STEM) among students, teachers and members of the public in Ireland.

DSE’s mission is to contribute to Ireland's continued growth and development as a society that has an active and informed interest and involvement in science, engineering and technology.

Overall DSE objectives are to increase the numbers of students studying the physical sciences, promote a positive attitude to careers in science, technology, engineering and mathematics and to foster a greater understanding of science and its value to Irish society.

In September 2009, Discover Science & Engineering launched a redeveloped corporate website built on the open source CMS, WordPress.

DSE runs numerous initiatives, including:
My Science Career
Project Blogger
Science.ie
Science Week Ireland
Greenwave
Discover Primary Science
Discover sensors

See also
 Sentinus, equivalent in Northern Ireland

References

External links 
Discover-Science.ie – official website of Discover Science & Engineering (DSE)
My Science Career - resources for finding out more about a career in science, technology, engineering or mathematics (STEM)
Follow Science.ie on Twitter
MyScience.ie - DSE blog about Irish science
I Love Science Bebo page
DSE YouTube channel - videos from the Science Week Lecture Series and the BT Young Scientist

Science education in Ireland
Science and technology in the Republic of Ireland
Learning programs in Europe